This list of tallest buildings in North Korea ranks the tallest buildings in North Korea by height. The tallest buildings are only found in the capital city Pyongyang and most of them are hotels or residential buildings.

Tallest buildings
An equal sign (=) following a rank indicates the same height between two or more buildings.

See also

Outline of North Korea

Notes

References 

North Korea
North Korea
Tallest